The Taurus PT1911 is a replication of the US military model 1911 single-action recoil operated semi-automatic pistol. It was designed and manufactured by Taurus in Porto Alegre Brazil, and distributed in the US by Taurus USA. Announced at the 2005 SHOT Show, it was released to the consumer market in the fall of 2005.

The PT1911 differs from its many competitors in the 1911-style market in that it offers a package of features found on top-end models from more expensive semi-custom pistol manufacturers such as Springfield Armory, Para-Ordnance, and Kimber Manufacturing at a lower cost.

Featuring a forged steel frame and slide, the PT1911 was originally marketed with a blued carbon steel finish, but as of late 2007 a stainless steel version was released. The standard PT1911 includes combat and competition features such as a "Beavertail" grip safety with memory groove, extended ambidextrous thumb safety and slide stop controls, lowered and flared ejection port and frame checkering.

Specifications
 length: 8 ½ in
 width: 1 ½ in
 height: 5.45 in
 weight: 38 oz for B, BHW and DT, (32 oz for B3), (39.4 oz for B1), (33 oz for AL), (33.6 oz for ALR)
 trigger pull: 3–5 lb
 .45 ACP caliber and 9mm
 5 in 1:16 twist, 6 groove barrel
 single action
 semi-automatic
 trigger actuated ‘California spec’ firing pin drop safety
 8 round detachable steel single-column magazine (9-round magazine for the 9mm version)
 blued carbon steel or satin stainless steel finish

Features

Included accessories
 2 eight-round magazines
 barrel bushing wrench
 sight adj. screw Allen wrench
 2 safety lock keys
 manual
 padded plastic storage box

Variants
 PT1911B   - Blued forged steel basic version (originally sold w/ 2 magazines)
 PT1911B1  - Blued carbon steel with Picatinny rail
 PT1911B3  - Blued carbon steel 'Compact' concealed carry model styled after the Colt CCO (Concealed carry officer) pistol.
 PT1911B-BHW - Blued carbon steel with Bull's Head Walnut grips
 PT1911SS  - Stainless steel basic version
 PT1911SS1 - Stainless steel with Picatinny rail
 PT1911SS-BHW - Stainless steel with Bull's Head Walnut grips
 PT1911AL  - Aluminium frame and blued carbon steel slide
 PT1911ALR - Aluminium frame and blued carbon steel slide, with Picatinny rail.  Pistol slide is marked as PT 1911 AR.
 PT1911DT  - DuoTone blued carbon steel frame with mirror finish steel slide
 PT1911FS  -  Blued forged steel basic version (sold w/ single magazine)
 PT191101-B1 Matte Black Full (Picatinny rail) 2 magazines

Accuracy results
In an article in the August 2006 edition of American Rifleman magazine, the following accuracy results (five shot groups at 25 yards) were documented at:

References

 PT1911 review on Gunblast.com
 Stainless PT1911 review on Gunblast.com
 Michael Bane (Host of Outdoor channel show ‘Shooting Gallery’) PT1911 review
 2008 Taurus On-Line Catalog
 9mm PT1911

External links
 Taurus United States web site

9mm Parabellum semi-automatic pistols
.45 ACP semi-automatic pistols
Semi-automatic pistols of Brazil
1911 platform